Mount Surprise is a rural town and locality in the Shire of Etheridge, Queensland, Australia.

Geography 

History 
The town was founded by Ezra Firth, from the English county of Yorkshire, who along with his family settled in the area in 1864.  The property struggled at first; relations with the indigenous inhabitants of the country were hostile and the country was not suited for wool growing.  The discovery of gold in the 1880s and the subsequent gold rush allowed Firth to sell his sheep to the miners, convert his holding to cattle and become wealthy selling goods to the miners.  In 1908, the Etheridge railway line reached Mount Surprise.

Mount Surprise Post Office opened by July 1908.

In October 1942 detachments of 16 Australian Field Company, Royal Australian Engineers travelled to Cooktown, Mount Surprise and Coen to build Repeater Huts.

Mount Surprise State School opened on 12 February 1917.

At the 2006 census, Mount Surprise and the surrounding area had a population of 162.

In the 2011 census, Mount Surprise had a population of 306 people.

Heritage listings 
Mount Surprise has a number of heritage-listed sites, including:
 Gulf Developmental Road: Radar Hill
 Via Mount Surprise: Quartz Hill Coach Change Station
 Etheridge railway line: Mount Surprise railway station

Education
Mount Surprise State School is a government primary (Early Childhood-6) school for boys and girls at Garland Street. In 2018, the school had an enrolment of 23 students with 3 teachers and 5 non-teaching staff (2 full-time equivalent).

There are no secondary schools in Mount Surprise, nor nearby. Distance education and boarding school are options.

Amenities
The town has a pub, one cafe, two petrol stations with a small store, a post office, a train station, a gem-shop, a police station and two trailer parks or caravan parks. One park, Bedrock Village Caravan Park & Tours, has camp sites, cabins and a pool. It is one of the tour operators for guided tours to the lava tubes at Undara Volcanic National Park. At the Mount Surprise Tourist Park, a large bird aviary is open to the public.

Attractions
Some of the Savannahlander tourist rail services start from, passes through, or stop at Mount Surprise.

Collins Lookout is in the north of the locality. It is within the Byrimine cattle station.

The town is near the Undara Volcanic National Park and Forty Mile Scrub National Park. Other activities in the area include gem fossicking.

Gallery

References

External links

 

 
Towns in Queensland
Shire of Etheridge
Localities in Queensland